LaRoyce  C. Hawkins (born May 4, 1988) is an American actor, stand-up comedian, spoken word artist, and musician. Hawkins stars on NBC's  police drama  Chicago P.D., where he portrays Officer Kevin Atwater. The show is in its tenth season. Hawkins also has a main role on the crossover show Chicago Fire.

Early life
Hawkins was born and raised in Harvey, Illinois, a southern suburb of Chicago. While Hawkins was growing up he lived with his grandparents until he was 13 and he credits them with shaping his life and the lives of his siblings.

Hawkins attended Thornton High School, where he initially played basketball. Influenced by his grandfather's advice to “choose what makes you feel better,” Hawkins left the basketball team sophomore year and joined the speech team, where he became a two-time state champion. 

In 2005, Hawkins won the state title in the Illinois High School Association's Original Comedy event, also placing third at the IHSA state competition in Humorous Interpretation. In 2006, he and a partner won the state title in Humorous Duet Acting, while Hawkins also placed fourth at state that year in Original Comedy.

Career
Hawkins attended Illinois State University on a full tuition scholastic scholarship where he majored in theatre arts. In his first college play, he starred as Toledo from the August Wilson production Ma Rainey's Black Bottom. While in college, he landed his first major motion picture role in the feature film The Express: The Ernie Davis Story, the biopic of Ernie Davis, portraying Davis' teammate Art Baker. He took a year-and-a-half off of school, returning in 2007. He is a member of Omega Psi Phi fraternity. He graduated in 2012.

Prior to Chicago P.D., Hawkins made appearances in various television series, including HBO's Ballers, TBS' Tyler Perry's House of Payne, MTV's Underemployed, and ABC's Detroit 1-8-7.

Filmography

Film

Television

References

External links

Illinois State University alumni
Male actors from Chicago
21st-century American male actors
Living people
1988 births